The  is the title for the monarch of the historical Ashanti Empire as well as the ceremonial ruler of the Ashanti people today. The Ashanti royal house traces its line to the Oyoko (an Abusua, or "clan") Abohyen Dynasty of Nana Twum and the Bretuo Dynasty of Osei Tutu Opemsoo, who formed the Empire of Ashanti in 1701 and was crowned Asantehene (King of all Asante). Osei Tutu held the throne until his death in battle in 1717, and was the sixth king in Ashanti royal history.

The Asantehene is the ruler of the Ashanti people. The Asantehene is traditionally enthroned on a golden stool known as the Sika 'dwa, and the office is sometimes referred to by this name. The Asantehene is also the titular ruler of Kumasi, which served as the capital of the Ashanti Empire and today, the Ashanti Region. The Ashanti Empire comprised parts of present-day southern Ghana and portions of present-day eastern Côte d'Ivoire between the 17th and 20th centuries.

The current Asantehene is Otumfuo Nana Osei Tutu II, born Nana Kwaku Dua, who ascended as the 16th Asante king in April 1999. Osei Tutu II was one of seven descendants who were eligible to the heir presumptive.

Elections and regents
During the period between the death of an Asantehene and the election of a successor, the Mamponghene, the Asantehene's deputy, acts as a regent. This policy was only changed during a time of civil war in the late 19th century, when the Kwasafomanhyiamu or governing council itself ruled as regent. The succession is decided by a series of councils of Asante nobles and other royal family members.

The colonial era and Asante independence

The Ashanti Confederacy was made a British protectorate in 1902, and the office of Asantehene was discontinued. In 1926, the British permitted the repatriation of Prempeh I – whom they had exiled to the Seychelles in 1896 – and allowed him to adopt the title Kumasehene, but not Asantehene. However, in 1935, the British finally granted the Ashanti moderated self-rule as the Kingdom of Ashanti, and the title of Asantehene was revived.

On 6 March 1957, the Kingdom of Ashanti and the Northern Territories, the Gold Coast Crown Colony and the British Mandate of Togoland to form the modern state of Ghana. The office of Asantehene is now a sub-national constitutional monarchy, and is protected by the Ghanaian constitution.

List of rulers
All rulers in the lists below were members of the Oyoko Abohyen Dynasty.

Kwaamanhene of the Kwaaman State

Kumasehene of the Kumaseman State

Asantehene of the Kingdom of Ashanti (Ashanti Empire)
All regents were members of the Bretuo Dynasty who were and still are the holders of the title Mamponghene. Upon the death of the Asantehene, it is the task of the Mamponghene to act as the regent, or Awisiahene.

See also 
Emblem of His Majesty the King of Ashanti

References

Further reading
 Robert B. Edgerton, 1995, The Fall of the Asante Empire. The Hundred-Year War for Africa's Gold Coast. New York: The Free Press. 
 Alan Lloyd, 1964, The Drums of Kumasi, London: Panther.
 Ernest E. Obeng, 1986, Ancient Ashanti Chieftaincy, Ghana Publishing Corporation. 
 Kevin Shillington, 1995 (1989), History of Africa, New York: St. Martin's Press.

External links
 BBC News | Africa | Opoku Ware II | Rites for Ashanti king
 Ashanti Kingdom at the Wonders of the African World, at PBS
 Kingdom of Ashanti Kings And Queens Of Asante. Retrieved 8 November 2012.

 
Lists of African monarchs
Titles of national or ethnic leadership
Government of Ghana
Rulers